Santa Ana (La Florida) is an important archaeological site in the highlands of Ecuador, going back as early as 3,500 BC. It is located in the Palanda Canton, just to the north of its regional capital of :es:Palanda, in the Zamora-Chinchipe Province of Ecuador.

Geography
This ancient settlement is located on the eastern slope of the Andes, in a transitional zone between the highlands and the lowland jungles in a narrow Palanda River valley. The small Palanda River flows into Mayo-Chinchipe river, and eventually into the Rio Marañon.

The two principal zones of the site cover an area of about 1 hectare.

Research
The work in this area was started in 2002 by a team of French and Ecuadoran archaeologists.

Santa-Ana/La Florida has been studied by archaeologists since then, under the leadership of Francisco Valdez. This represents a discovery of a new ancient culture in the Chinchipe river basin on the border of present-day Ecuador and Peru.

It is now known as Mayo-Chinchipe culture; its area extends from the Podocarpus National Park in Ecuador, to the area where Chinchipe River flows into the Marañon (near Bagua, Peru). This ancient culture received its name from the river names. In Ecuador, the river is known as Chinchipe, while in Peru it's known as Mayo.

Carbon dated to 5,500 BP (3,500 BC), these discoveries belong to the early Formative Period in Ecuadorian chronology, and to the Archaic or Preceramic period of Peru.
A village with a central sunken plaza has been discovered. One of the two artificial platforms features a temple with a spiral configuration, and a ceremonial hearth, where a cache of greenstone offerings had been found.

"Several tombs have been documented with fine ceramic vessels; exquisite polished stone bowls and mortars, as well as hundreds of turquoise and malachite beads fragments of Strombus sea shells, and small sculptures."Francisco Valdez (2014), The Mayo Chinchipe-Marañón Culture: Pandora’s Box in the Upper Amazon. Dumbarton Oaks Pre-Columbian Studies palanda.arqueo-ecuatoriana.ec

A range of diverse objects have been found, such as ceramic bottles, plain or ornamented stone bowls, medallions and pieces of necklace in turquoise, malachite and other green stones.

Major construction at the site occurred from 2,600 to 1,700 BC.

Agriculture
The following agricultural crops have been documented,

corn (Zea mays), 
beans (Fabacceae), 
manioc (Manihot esculenta), 
sweet potato (Ipomooea sp.), 
Dioscorea sp.,
Arrowroot (Maranta sp.), 
hot peppers (Capsicum sp.), 
cacao (Theobroma sp.)
coca (Erythroxylum coca)

Earliest archaeological evidence of Cacao use 
In 2018, the Nature Ecology and Evolution journal reported from Santa Ana what is believed to be the earliest cacao (Theobroma cacao L.) use in the Americas. This evidence, comes from approximately 5,300 years ago (or 3,300 BC).

Traditionally, cacao was thought to have been first domesticated in Mesoamerica. Yet it's known that cacao’s greatest genetic diversity is in the upper Amazon region of northwest South America. Thus, this region must have been the ultimate centre of origin. But how it got from there to Mexico remained unknown. Now Santa Ana provides the missing link.

The scholars used three independent lines of archaeological evidence (cacao starch grains, absorbed theobromine residues and ancient DNA dating) to confirm their findings.

So far, this is the earliest evidence of Cacao use in the Americas. Also, this is the first clear archaeological evidence of its pre-Columbian use on the South American continent.

See also 
 Pre-Columbian Ecuador
 Cultural periods of Peru
 Ancient Peru
 Montegrande (archaeological site)

References

Bibliography 
 Human settlements already existed in the Amazon Basin (Ecuador) 4000 years ago - 12 May 2004 eurekalert.org
 Valdez, Francisco. “Inter-zonal relationships in Ecuador”, in Handbook of South American Archaeology, Helaine Silverman y William Isbell eds., Springer, pp. 865–891, 2008
 Valdez, Francisco; Jean Gufroy; Geoffroy de Saulieu; Julio Hurtado; Alexandra Yépez (2005), Découverte d’un site cérémoniel formatif sur le versant oriental des Andes Proyecto Zamora Chinchipe

History of Ecuador
Archaic period in the Americas
Archaeology of Ecuador